Millam is a commune in the Nord department in northern France.

A chapel dedicated to the Mercian Saint Mildrith (Mildred), Abbess of Minster-in-Thanet, who is said to have stayed there, exists in Millam, but is privately owned and not easily visited.

Heraldry

See also
Communes of the Nord department

References

Communes of Nord (French department)
French Flanders